Georges Piot (14 September 1896 – 5 April 1980) was a French rower who competed in the 1924 Summer Olympics and in the 1928 Summer Olympics.

In 1924 he won the silver medal with his partner Maurice Monney-Bouton in the coxless pair event. Four years later he was part of the French boat which was eliminated in the second round of the coxed four competition.

References

External links
Georges Piot's profile at databaseOlympics

1896 births
1980 deaths
French male rowers
Olympic rowers of France
Rowers at the 1924 Summer Olympics
Rowers at the 1928 Summer Olympics
Olympic silver medalists for France
Olympic medalists in rowing
Medalists at the 1924 Summer Olympics